Henry Rorig (born 3 March 2000) is a German professional footballer who plays as a right-back for  club VfL Osnabrück.

Career
Rorig joined Werder Bremen's youth team from VfL Wolfsburg's in 2015.

He joined 3. Liga side 1. FC Magdeburg from Werder Bremen II in summer 2020.

In June 2022, Rorig signed with VfL Osnabrück.

References

2000 births
Living people
German footballers
People from Hanover Region
Footballers from Lower Saxony
Association football fullbacks
SV Werder Bremen II players
1. FC Magdeburg players
VfL Osnabrück players
Regionalliga players
3. Liga players